The 2006 Cecafa Senior Challenge Cup, sometimes called the Al Amoudi Senior Challenge Cup due to being sponsored by Ethiopian millionaire Mohammed Hussein Al Amoudi, was the 30th edition of the international football tournament, which involved teams from Southern and Central Africa. The matches were all played in Addis Ababa from 25 November to 10 December. It was competed between the same teams as the previous tournament, except for Eritrea, who did not enter due to their long-running clash with Ethiopia regarding borders, and Kenya, the five-time champions, were serving a ban which was issued on 18 October 2006, which was then an indefinite from international football by the decree of the Fédération Internationale de Football Association ('International Federation of Association Football'), or FIFA; this after Kenya "regularly violated or ignored" "Fifa's statutes, regulations and decisions". Malawi and Zambia joined the tournament after being invited, and competed as guest teams as they were from the federation Council of Southern Africa Football Associations (COSAFA), whereas the rest of the teams were from the Council for East and Central Africa Football Associations (CECAFA). The reasoning behind their invitation was that it would "boost the competitiveness of this year's tournament". The defending champions, Ethiopia, were knocked out in the quarter-finals after coming second in their group, and Sudan claimed their second title despite being beaten by Zambia, as Zambia were guests.

Background 
The CECAFA Cup is considered Africa's oldest football tournament, and involves teams from Central and Southern Africa. The matches in the 1973 tournament were played from 22 September 1973 until 29 September 1973. The tournament was originally the Gossage Cup, contested by the four nations of Kenya, Uganda, Tanganyika (modern day Tanzania), and Zanzibar, running from 1929 until 1965. In 1967, this became the East and Central African Senior Challenge Cup, often shortened to simply the Challenge Cup, which was competed for five years, until 1971, before the CECAFA Cup was introduced in 1973. Ethiopia were the defending champions, having won the 2005 tournament in Rwanda, after finishing second in their group, and going on to beat Zanzibar and Rwanda in the final. The 2006 champions Sudan failed, however, to emerge from the 2005 group stages.

Participants 
11 teams competed, four teams from the original tournament competed (excluding Tanganyika, which changed names and is currently called Tanzania).

Group stages 
The group stage began on 25 November and ended on 3 December with Group C's final matches between Rwanda against Sudan, and Uganda against Somalia. Groups A and C contained four teams, but as there were only 11 partaking teams, group B contained only the three teams of Burundi, Zambia, and Zanzibar. At the end of the group stage, the team who finished bottom of their group was eliminated, whereas the teams who finished in positions other than last in the group progressed to the knock-out rounds.

If two or more teams are equal on points on completion of the group matches, the following criteria are applied to determine the rankings (in descending order):

 Number of points obtained in games between the teams involved;
 Goal difference in games between the teams involved;
 Goals scored in games between the teams involved;
 Away goals scored in games between the teams involved;
 Goal difference in all games;
 Goals scored in all games;
 Drawing of lots.

Group A

Group B

Group C

Knock-out stages

Quarter-finals
The second quarter-final match, which was held on 6 December between Ethiopia and Zambia, was subject of an emergency meeting between Ugandan chair Dennis Obua, Ethiopian Ashebir W'Giorgis, Sundanian Ahmed Maazal, and the match commissioner who hailed from Zanzibar, Ali Ferej. At the meeting on the same day as the match, it was adjudged that the referee, Rwandan Issa Kagabi, had blown the final whistle to end the game too soon. Zambia stated that they would not partake in any rematch with Ethiopia, and in a similar fashion, the CECAFA secretary general Nicholas Musonye, absent from the meeting, cast aside the idea of a replay and called the makers of the decision "old farts", and delivered the ultimatum that if any replay went ahead, he would cancel the entirety of the tournament. After this, the Ethiopian Football Association did not seek a replay, and left the tournament after their loss.

Semi-finals

Third place play-off
The third place play-off was between Rwanda and Uganda. Rwanda were the 2005 runners up, and in that tournament beat Uganda in the semi-finals, in 2006 they beat Uganda 4–2 on penalties to clinch third-place in the tournament.

Final
The final between Zambia and Sudan finished 0–0 after extra time, but Zambia won on penalties. Although Zambia won the final, the trophy was awarded to Sudan, who Zambia beat in the final. This was as Zambia were only a guest team, from the COSAFA federation, therefore the trophy was awarded to the highest finishing CECAFA federation team: Sudan.

Team statistics
Teams are ranked using the same tie-breaking criteria as in the group stage, except for the top four teams.

|-
|colspan="14"|08Third-place play-off
|-

|-
|colspan="14"|08Eliminated in the quarter finals
|-

|-
|colspan="14"|08Eliminated in the group stages
|-

References

CECAFA Cup
2006 in African football
2006 in Ethiopian sport
International association football competitions hosted by Ethiopia